Desmond Heeley (1 June 1931 - 10 June 2016) was a British set and costume designer who had an active international career in theater, ballet and opera from the late 1940s through the 2010s.

Career 

Heeley was born in Staffordshire, England and  began his career as an apprentice designer at the Royal Shakespeare Theatre in 1948, and soon established himself as an important designer at that theater and at Sadler's Wells Theatre in London. In 1957, he designed his first set for the Stratford Festival in Ontario, Canada, with whom he established a very long professional relationship, designing sets for more than 40 productions through 2009. He also designed sets and costumes for several Broadway productions and at the Metropolitan Opera.

Awards 
Heeley has won three Tony Awards. He was notably the first designer to win Tony Awards for both sets and costumes for the same production with his work on the Royal National Theatre production of Rosencrantz and Guildenstern are Dead in 1968. His third Tony Award win was for the costumes for The Importance of Being Earnest in 2011.

References

External links 
 Desmond Heeley designs and production files, circa 1880s-2016 (bulk 1955-2014), held by the Billy Rose Theatre Division, New York Public Library for the Performing Arts
 Interview with Stratford Festival costumer Cynthia MacLennan on working with Heeley (Theatre Museum Canada).

1931 births
2016 deaths
British costume designers
Set designers
Tony Award winners